Tetragonoderus dispar is a species of beetle in the family Carabidae. It was described by Peringuey in 1892.

References

dispar
Beetles described in 1892